The Edison Commercial Historic District is a  historic district in Edison, Georgia, United States that was listed on the National Register of Historic Places in 2000.  It included 22 contributing buildings and a contributing structure, plus three buildings not deemed to contribute to the historic character of the district.

Most of the buildings are brick commercial buildings, and either one- or two-story.  The majority front on Hartford Street, the main east–west street through the town.

Selected buildings in the district include:
Farmers Trading Company building (1912)
Theatre building (1951)
a former Bank of Edison building built in 1904 which is currently the city hall; this building is deemed non-contributing due to non-historic brick veneer which has been added to its facades.

References

Historic districts on the National Register of Historic Places in Georgia (U.S. state)
Buildings and structures completed in 1902
National Register of Historic Places in Calhoun County, Georgia